Pokrovka is a rural locality (a selo) and the administrative center of Pokrovsky Selsoviet of Loktevsky District, Altai Krai, Russia. The population was 852 as of 2016. There are 12 streets.

Geography 
Pokrovka is located 47 km north of Gornyak (the district's administrative centre) by road. Georgiyevka is the nearest rural locality.

References 

Rural localities in Loktevsky District